Kevin Hanssen, is a Zimbabwean actor, author and musician. He is best known for the roles in the films Mind Games, Mugabe and The Telling Room.

Career
In 1994, he obtained Bachelor of Arts degree in Industrial Psychology from UNISA, South Africa. He is also a founding member of Over the Edge Theatre Company. He acted in the stage play 'A Man Like You' which was staged in many Zimbabwean theaters.

Awards
He has won several awards at many international festivals.

 BAT Best Supporting Actor – I’m Not Rappaport (1993)
 Pick of the Fringe Award, Edinburgh Festival – Twelfth Night (2001)
 Spirit of the Fringe Award, Edinburgh Festival – Born African (2003)
 BAT Best Actor Award – Miss Julie (2010)
 AFDIS Best Actor Award – An Inspector Calls (2015)
 Best Actor Award, Zimbabwe International Film Festival – Mind Games (2017)
 AFDIS Best Actor Award – My Fair Lady (2017)

Filmography

References

External links
 
 TAGGED: KEVIN HANSSEN

Living people
21st-century Zimbabwean male actors
Year of birth missing (living people)
Zimbabwean male film actors